This is a list of dinosaurs whose remains have been recovered from Africa. Africa has a rich fossil record, but it is patchy and incomplete. It is rich in Triassic and Early Jurassic dinosaurs. African dinosaurs from these time periods include Coelophysis, Dracovenator, Melanorosaurus, Massospondylus, Euskelosaurus, Heterodontosaurus, Abrictosaurus, and Lesothosaurus. In the Middle Jurassic, the sauropods Atlasaurus, Chebsaurus, Jobaria, and Spinophorosaurus, flourished, as well as the theropod Afrovenator.  The Late Jurassic is well represented in Africa, mainly thanks to the spectacular Tendaguru Formation in Lindi Region of Tanzania. Veterupristisaurus, Ostafrikasaurus, Elaphrosaurus, Giraffatitan, Dicraeosaurus, Janenschia, Tornieria, Tendaguria, Kentrosaurus, and Dysalotosaurus are among the dinosaurs whose remains have been recovered from Tendaguru. This fauna seems to show strong similarities to that of the Morrison Formation in the United States and the Lourinha Formation in Portugal. For example, similar theropods, ornithopods and sauropods have been found in both the Tendaguru and the Morrison. This has important biogeographical implications. 

The Early Cretaceous in Africa is known primarily from the northern part of the continent, particularly Niger. Suchomimus, Elrhazosaurus, Rebbachisaurus, Nigersaurus,  Kryptops, Nqwebasaurus, and Paranthodon are some of the Early Cretaceous dinosaurs known from Africa. The Early Cretaceous was an important time for the dinosaurs of Africa because it was when Africa finally separated from South America, forming the South Atlantic Ocean. This was an important event because now the dinosaurs of Africa started developing endemism because of isolation.
The Late Cretaceous of Africa is known mainly from North Africa. During the early part of the Late Cretaceous, North Africa was home to a rich dinosaur fauna. It includes Spinosaurus, Carcharodontosaurus, Rugops, Bahariasaurus, Deltadromeus, Paralititan, Aegyptosaurus, and Ouranosaurus.

Criteria for inclusion
The genus must appear on the List of dinosaur genera.
At least one named species of the creature must have been found in Africa.
This list is a complement to :Category:Dinosaurs of Africa.

List of African dinosaurs

Valid genera

Invalid and potentially valid genera 

 Aetonyx palustris: A potential junior synonym of Massospondylus.
 Fabrosaurus australis: Sometimes considered to be part of a family of small ornithischians called fabrosaurids. It may potentially be a synonym of Lesothosaurus.
 Gigantoscelus molengraafi: Probably a synonym of Euskelosaurus, but it cannot be confirmed.
 Gyposaurus: The African species, G. capensis, be a juvenile of a contemporary sauropodomorph. A Chinese species has also been named, but it may not belong to this genus.
 Hortalotarsus skirtopodus: A possible synonym of Massospondylus.
 "Likhoelesaurus": Suggested to be a giant, early carnosaur but might actually be a pseudosuchian.
 Megapnosaurus: The African species M. rhodesiensis might belong to the genus Coelophysis. Another referred species, M. kayentakatae, probably needs its own genus name, as the current one, "Syntarsus", is preoccupied by an insect.
 Nyasasaurus parringtoni: Described in 2013 as the oldest known dinosaur, dating back to the Anisian, but both this date and its classification have been questioned.
 Sigilmassasaurus brevicollis: A spinosaurid contemporary with Spinosaurus; its status as a distinct genus and/or species is uncertain.
 Torvosaurus: Teeth originally named as Megalosaurus ingens have been reassigned to this genus, but not as a distinct species.

Timeline
This is a timeline of selected dinosaurs from the list above.  Time is measured in mya along the x-axis.

See also
 List of African birds

References

Africa
†Dinosaurs
Articles which contain graphical timelines